Crespino is a comune (municipality) in the Province of Rovigo in the Italian region Veneto, located about  southwest of Venice and about  southeast of Rovigo.

The municipality of Crespino contains the frazioni (subdivisions, mainly villages and hamlets) Arginello, Il Gorgo, La Banchina di Sopra, La Ruota, La Zagatta, Passodoppio, San Cassiano, and Selva.

Crespino borders the following municipalities: Berra, Ceregnano, Gavello, Guarda Veneta, Pontecchio Polesine, Ro, Rovigo, Villanova Marchesana.

Demographic evolution

References

External links 

 www.comune.crespino.ro.it/

Cities and towns in Veneto